Harriet Hudson (born 22 January 1998) is an Australian national representative rower. She is a three-time national senior champion, twice won silver medals at World U23 Championships and is an Olympian. She competed in the Australian women's quad scull at Tokyo 2021 winning a bronze medal.

Club and state rowing
Raised in Warwick, Queensland Hudson was schooled at Somerville House in Brisbane where she took up rowing. Her senior rowing has been from the Sydney Rowing Club.

Having relocated to Sydney for her tertiary studies Hudson became eligible to represent New South Wales at the Interstate Regatta and she rowed in the NSW senior women's eight contesting the Queen's Cup in 2017, 2018   2019 and 2022. The 2019 crew were victorious. In 2022 she was also selected as NSW's single sculling entrant and raced to victory in the Nell Slatter Trophy at the 2022 Interstate Regatta.

In Sydney Rowing Club colours Hudson contested and won all three U19 Australian national titles in the sculling boat classes at the 2016 Australian Rowing Championships. In 2017 she raced in the open class placing 2nd in the double-scull and winning her first senior national title in a composite quad scull with her national training partners. In 2018 she again placed in both the double and the quad at the Australian championships. In 2019 she contested all three national sculling titles in the U23 age division in her campaign for selection for the U23 World Championships. She won the double-scull national title with Giorgia Patten.

In 2021 Hudson won her second Australian senior national title in a composite quad with her Australian representative teammates Meredith, Cronin and Thompson. At the Australian Rowing Championships in 2022 she won another national title - the open women's coxed eight - in a composite Australian selection crew.

International representative rowing
Hudson made her Australian representative debut at the 2016 World Junior Rowing Championships in Rotterdam where she raced in the single scull to a sixth-place finish. In 2017 she was selected in the Australian U23 quad scull with Rowena Meredith, Caitlin Cronin and Genevieve Horton and raced to a silver medal at the World Rowing U23 Championships in Plovdiv, Bulgaria.

In 2018 Hudson and Ria Thompson raced at the World Rowing Cup III as a double-scull finishing 12th overall, two weeks later they rowed at the World U23 Rowing Championships in Poznan for a fifth-place finish. In 2019 Hudson teamed up with Patten and trained in Western Australia under coach Rhett Ayliffe. They were selected to row Australia's double-scull at the U23 World Championships in Sarasota-Bradenton where they won a silver medal behind Greece.

The Australian quad scull had raced in 2019 at World Cups and the World Championships but failed to qualify the boat for Tokyo. Before those delayed Tokyo Olympics at the final Olympic qualification regatta in Lucerne, Switzerland in May 2021 Hudson was selected  with Meredith, Thompson and Caitlin Cronin to make a final attempt to qualify. Victories in their heat and final saw them secure an Olympic berth. In Tokyo Hudson rowed the three seat of the Australian quad. They placed fourth in their heat and then won the repechage to make the A final. They were behind the lead for much of the race but winds had blown up before the event and some crews struggled with their bladework in the chop. The Australian quad kept their composure and excellent technique and managed a bronze medal finish on the line.

In March 2022 Hudson was selected in the sculling squad of the broader Australian training team to prepare for the 2022 international season and the 2022 World Rowing Championships.  She raced at the World Rowing Cup II in Poznan in the Australian women's quad scull to a fourth placing. At the 2022 World Rowing Championships at Racize, she rowed in the Australian quad scull to an overall sixth place finish.

References

1998 births
Australian female rowers
Living people
People from Queensland
Olympic rowers of Australia
Rowers at the 2020 Summer Olympics
Medalists at the 2020 Summer Olympics
Olympic bronze medalists for Australia
Olympic medalists in rowing
21st-century Australian women